Elena di Liddo (born 8 September 1993) is an Italian swimmer. She competed at the 2020 Summer Olympics, in 100 m butterfly.

She won two silver individual medals at the 2017 Summer Universiade. and two with the relay team, in two different editions of the European Short Course Swimming Championships.

Career
Di Liddo won two medals (one individual and one with the relay team) at the 2013 Mediterranean Games. In 2021 she won two bronze medals with the relay team at the Swimming European Championships Hungary 2020.

Achievements

See also
 List of Italian records in swimming

References

External links
 

1993 births
Living people
Italian female butterfly swimmers
Italian female freestyle swimmers
Universiade medalists in swimming
Swimmers at the 2010 Summer Youth Olympics
Swimmers at the 2020 Summer Olympics
Olympic swimmers of Italy
European Aquatics Championships medalists in swimming
European Championships (multi-sport event) bronze medalists
Sportspeople from the Province of Barletta-Andria-Trani
Mediterranean Games gold medalists for Italy
Mediterranean Games silver medalists for Italy
Mediterranean Games medalists in swimming
Swimmers at the 2013 Mediterranean Games
Universiade gold medalists for Italy
Universiade silver medalists for Italy
Swimmers at the 2018 Mediterranean Games
Medalists at the 2015 Summer Universiade
Medalists at the 2017 Summer Universiade
Medalists at the FINA World Swimming Championships (25 m)
21st-century Italian women